|}

The Long Distance Hurdle is a Grade 2 National Hunt hurdle race in Great Britain which is open to horses aged four years or older. It is run at Newbury over a distance of about 3 miles (3 miles and 52 yards, or 4,876 metres), and during its running there are twelve hurdles to be jumped. The race is scheduled to take place each year in late November or early December.

The event was established in 1990.

Records
Most successful horse (4 wins):
 Big Buck's –  2009, 2010, 2011, 2012

Leading jockey (5 wins):
 Tony McCoy – Deano's Beeno (1999,2000), Baracouda (2004), Duc de Regniere (2008), Big Buck's (2010)

Leading trainer (5 wins):
 Paul Nicholls – Big Buck's (2009,2010,2011,2012), Celestial Halo (2013)

Winners

See also
 Horse racing in Great Britain
 List of British National Hunt races

References
  Racing Post:
 
 pedigreequery.com – Long Distance Hurdle – Newbury.

National Hunt races in Great Britain
Newbury Racecourse
National Hunt hurdle races
Recurring sporting events established in 1990
1990 establishments in England